Caducifer camelopardalus is a species of sea snail, a marine gastropod mollusk in the family Prodotiidae.

Description

Distribution
This snail is found in Brazil.

References

External links

Prodotiidae
Gastropods described in 2009